Gloire Amanda (born November 11, 1998) is a Canadian professional soccer player.

Early life
Amanda was born in the Nyarugusu refugee camp to Congolese parents. His family moved to Edmonton, Alberta, Canada, when he was 8 years old. He played youth soccer with Edmonton Internazionale, Edmonton Extreme FC, and at St. Nicholas Soccer Academy where he played with Canadian national team player Alphonso Davies. He then joined the FC Edmonton Academy for a year. He trialled with the Vancouver Whitecaps Academy in 2013, before ultimately joining them in 2014.

College career
Ahead of the 2018 NCAA Division I men's soccer season, Amanda signed a National Letter of Intent to play college soccer for the Oregon State Beavers men's soccer program. In 2020, in his junior season, he led the NCAA Division I in goals (15) and total points (37), setting the OSU single-season record for points and was named to the All-Pac-12 and All-Far West Region first team, the United Soccer Coaches’ All-America first team and Top Drawer Soccer Best XI first team, and an All-American. He also was named the 2020 MAC Hermann Trophy winner as the top player in the NCAA, becoming the first Oregon State player to win the award.

Club career
Amanda signed his first professional contract with Whitecaps FC 2 on March 31, 2017, having been with the Whitecaps academy since he was 15. In May 2017, Amanda was named to the Whitecaps roster for the 2017 Canadian Championship on a short term contract, which was allowed him to play in non-MLS matches. He would spend one season with Whitecaps FC 2 before the club ceased operations after the 2017 season. Rather than sign a USL deal with the Whitecaps new affiliate, Fresno FC, Amanda would elect to evaluate playing opportunities in college.

While playing for Oregon State, Amanda would sign with Lane United FC of the Premier Development League for the 2018 season.

In June 2021, Amanda joined newly-promoted Austrian Bundesliga side Austria Klagenfurt on a two-year deal. He scored his first goal on October 16, netting the equalizer against Rapid Wien in a 1-1 draw. In February 2023, he terminated his contract with the club by mutual consent.

International career
In 2015, he was called up to the Canadian under-18 team for the Slovakia Cup.

Career statistics

Personal 
His younger brother, Prince, is also a professional soccer player.

References

External links
Whitecaps bio

1998 births
Living people
All-American men's college soccer players
Association football forwards
People from Kigoma Region
Tanzanian people of Democratic Republic of the Congo descent
Tanzanian emigrants to Canada
Naturalized citizens of Canada
Canadian soccer players
USL Championship players
USL League Two players
Austrian Football Bundesliga players
Oregon State Beavers men's soccer players
Whitecaps FC 2 players
Lane United FC players
SK Austria Klagenfurt players
Soccer players from Edmonton
Canadian expatriate soccer players
Canadian expatriate sportspeople in the United States
Expatriate soccer players in the United States
Canadian expatriate sportspeople in Austria
Expatriate footballers in Austria